Verkhopenye is a rural locality (a selo) in Ivnyansky District, Belgorod Oblast, Russia. The population was 2,410 as of 2010. There are 22 streets.

Geography 
Verkhopenye is located 22 km north of Ivnya (the district's administrative centre) by road. Syrtsevo is the nearest rural locality.

References 

Rural localities in Ivnyansky District